USS Embattle is a name used more than once by the U.S. Navy:

 , a fleet minesweeper commissioned 25 April 1945.
 , a fleet minesweeper commissioned 16 November 1954.

United States Navy ship names